Allylpalladium(II) chloride dimer (APC) is a chemical compound with the formula [(η3-C3H5)PdCl]2. This yellow air-stable compound is an important catalyst used in organic synthesis.  It is one of the most widely used transition metal allyl complexes.

Structure 
The compound has a dimeric structure that is centrosymmetric. Each allyl group lies in a plane at an angle of about 111.5° to the square formed by the palladium and carbon atoms, and the Pd–C distances are all equal. Its unit cell is monoclinic.

Synthesis
The compound is prepared by purging carbon monoxide through a methanolic aqueous solution of sodium tetrachloropalladate (prepared from palladium(II) chloride and sodium chloride), and allyl chloride.
2 Na2PdCl4   +   2 CH2=CHCH2Cl   +   2 CO   +   2 H2O   →   [(η3-C3H5)PdCl]2   +   4 NaCl   +   2 CO2   +   4 HCl
Another method is the reaction of propene with palladium(II) trifluoroacetate, followed by ion exchange with chloride:
2 (CF3COO)2Pd + 2 CH2=CHCH3 → [(η3-C3H5)Pd(CF3COO)]2
[(η3-C3H5)Pd(CF3COO)]2 + 2 Cl− → [(η3-C3H5)PdCl]2 + 2 CF3COO−

Reactions 
APC reacts with sources of cyclopentadienyl anion to give the corresponding 18e− complex cyclopentadienyl allyl palladium:
[(η3-C3H5)PdCl]2   +   2 NaC5H5   →   2 [(η5-C5H5)Pd(η3-C3H5)]   +   2 NaCl

The dimer reacts with a variety of Lewis bases (:B)  to form adducts (η3-C3H5)PdCl:B. Its reaction with pyridine and the corresponding enthalpy are:
1/2 [(η3-C3H5)PdCl]2 + :NC5H5 → (η3-C3H5)PdCl:NC5H5 ΔH=−30.1 kJ.mol−1
This enthalpy corresponds to the enthalpy change for a reaction forming one mole of the product, (η3-C3H5)PdCl:NC5H5, from the acid dimer.
The dissociation energy for the Pd dimer, which is an energy contribution prior to reaction with the donor, 
 [(η3-C3H5)PdCl]2 → 2 (η3-C3H5)PdCl
has been determined by the ECW model to be 28 kJ.mol−1.

APC catalyzes many organic reactions, such as cross-coupling, nucleophilic addition to dienes, and decomposition of diazo compounds to reactive carbenes. It is also a useful precursor of other Pd catalysts.

References

Palladium compounds
Metal halides
Dimers (chemistry)
Chloro complexes
Allyl complexes